Dave Rylands (born 5 March 1953) is an English former footballer who played as a defender. Rylands started his career at Liverpool signing professional terms with the club when he was 17 years old in 1970. Rylands only made one appearance for Liverpool; he played in their 2–2 draw against Doncaster Rovers in the 1973–74 FA Cup.

References

External links
Dave Rylands at Aussie Footballers

1953 births
Living people
English footballers
Hereford United F.C. players
Liverpool F.C. players
English Football League players
Association football defenders